The Javanese language has a decimal numeral system with distinct words for the 'tweens' from 21 to 29, called likuran.

The basic numerals 1–10 have independent and combining forms, the latter derived via a suffix -ng. The combining forms are used to form the tens, hundreds, thousands, and millions. The numerals 1–5 and 10 have distinct high-register (halus, or in Javanese krama) and low register (ngoko) forms. The halus forms are listed below in italics. (Dasa 10 is derived from Sanskrit daśa.)

Like English, Javanese has compound forms for the teens; however, it also has a series of compound 'tweens', 21–29. The teens are based on a root -(wə)las, the tweens on -likur, and the tens are formed by the combining forms. Hyphens are not used in the orthography, but have been added to the table below to clarify their derivation.

Parallel to the tens are the hundreds (satus, rongatus); the thousands (séwu, rongéwu), and the millions (sayuta, rongyuta), except that the compounds of five and six are formed with limang- and nem- (séket 50 and suwidak/sewidak 60 are suppletive).

Old Javanese numerals
The names of the Old Javanese numerals were derived from their names in the Sanskrit language.

See also
Balinese numerals, a related but yet more complex numeral system.

References

Javanese language
Numerals